Cyclosternum is a genus of tarantulas that was first described by Anton Ausserer in 1871.

Species
 it contains twelve species, found in South America, Costa Rica, and Mexico:
Cyclosternum darienense Gabriel & Sherwood, 2022 = Panama
Cyclosternum familiare (Simon, 1889) – Venezuela
Cyclosternum garbei (Mello-Leitão, 1923) – Brazil
Cyclosternum gaujoni Simon, 1889 – Ecuador
Cyclosternum janthinum (Simon, 1889) – Ecuador
Cyclosternum kochi (Ausserer, 1871) – Venezuela
Cyclosternum ledezmae (Vol, 2001) – Bolivia
Cyclosternum palomeranum West, 2000 – Mexico
Cyclosternum rufohirtum (Simon, 1889) – Venezuela
Cyclosternum schmardae Ausserer, 1871 (type) – Colombia, Ecuador
Cyclosternum spinopalpus (Schaefer, 1996) – Paraguay
Cyclosternum viridimonte Valerio, 1982 – Costa Rica

Nomen dubium
 Cyclosternum pulcherrimaklaasi (Schmidt, 1991) - Ecuador

Transferred to other genera

 C. bicolor (Schiapelli & Gerschman, 1945) → Cyriocosmus bicolor
 C. chickeringi (Caporiacco, 1955) →  Tmesiphantes chickeringi (Nomina dubia)
 C. crassifemur (Gerschman & Schiapelli, 1960) → Tmesiphantes crassifemur
 C. fasciatum (O. Pickard-Cambridge, 1892) → Davus fasciatus
 C. hirsutum (Mello-Leitão, 1935) → Homoeomma hirsutum
 C. ischnoculiforme Franganillo, 1926 → Cyrtopholis ischnoculiformis
 C. janeirum (Keyserling, 1891) → Tmesiphantes janeira
 C. longipes (Schiapelli & Gerschman, 1945) →  Holothele longipes
 C. macropus (Ausserer, 1875) → Pseudoschizopelma macropus
 C. majus Franganillo, 1926 → Cyrtopholis major
 C. melloleitaoi Bücherl, Timotheo & Lucas, 1971 → Vitalius nondescriptus
 C. minensis (Mello-Leitão, 1943) → Plesiopelma minense
 C. multicuspidatum (Mello-Leitão, 1929) → Proshapalopus multicuspidatus
 C. nubilum (Simon, 1892) → Tmesiphantes nubilus
 C. obesum (Simon, 1892) → Bonnetina obscura (Nomina dubia)
 C. obscurum Simon, 1891 →  Bonnetina obscura
 C. pentalore (Simon, 1888) → Davus pentaloris
 C. physopus (Mello-Leitão, 1926) → Plesiopelma physopus
 C. rondoni (Lucas & Bücherl, 1972) → Holothele longipes
 C. semiaurantiacum Simon, 1897 → Plesiopelma semiaurantiacum
 C. serratum (Gerschman & Schiapelli, 1958) → Homoeomma uruguayense
 C. stylipum Valerio, 1982 → Stichoplastoris stylipus
 C. symmetricum (Bücherl, 1949) → Plesiopelma insulare

See also
 List of Theraphosidae species

References

External links

Theraphosidae genera
Spiders of Central America
Spiders of South America
Taxa named by Anton Ausserer
Theraphosidae
Arachnids